Joseph Leray (born in 1854 in Montoir-de-Bretagne) was a French clergyman and bishop for the Roman Catholic Diocese of Tarawa and Nauru. He was appointed bishop in 1897. He died in 1929.

References 

1854 births
1929 deaths
French Roman Catholic bishops
Roman Catholic bishops of Tarawa and Nauru